Cale Morton (born 18 January 1990) is a former Australian rules football player, recruited at pick 4 in the 2007 AFL Draft by the Melbourne Football Club.

Morton was a midfield/forward with a penetrating and accurate kick as well as being a good winner of the ball, both in the air and at ground level. He was ranked first at the 2007 Draft Camp for aerobic capability, recording a 15.2 beep test result.

Cale Morton attended Hale School in Western Australia and was a member of both the 1st XVIII football side and 1st XI cricket side, captaining the 1st XVIII in his final year at school.

His two brothers also played in the AFL. Mitch played for Richmond Football Club and the Sydney Swans and Jarryd played for the Hawthorn Football Club.

Cale also won the Larke Medal in 2007 for being the best player at the 2007 Under 18's National Championships.

Melbourne Demons
In 2008 he won the best first year player award at the Melbourne Football Club.
Cale was nominated for the NAB AFL Rising Star in Round 20, 2008.

West Coast Eagles
In the 2012 trade period, he was traded to the West Coast Eagles in exchange for pick 88.
Morton loomed as one of the trade bargains, lured back to Western Australia after five seasons and 73 games with Melbourne where he twice finished in the top 10 of the Demons' best and fairest count.
 
Tall and athletic at 192 cm and 88 kg, Morton played a variety of roles while at Melbourne, but spent most of his time through the midfield. The Eagles traded selection 88, secured from Port Adelaide after trading Lewis Stevenson to the Power, to land Morton.

The move didn't reinvigorate his career however, and he was delisted at the end of the 2013 season.

References

Melbourne FC article

External links

1990 births
Living people
Melbourne Football Club players
West Coast Eagles players
Claremont Football Club players
East Perth Football Club players
Casey Demons players
Australian rules footballers from Western Australia
People educated at Hale School
People from Lake Grace, Western Australia